Tuojiang Town is a town and the county seat in the northwest of Jianghua Yao Autonomous County, Hunan, China. Its seat is at Shujiashan of Baijiawei Village.

References

Towns of Hunan
Jianghua Yao Autonomous County
County seats in Hunan